The following is a list of all current and former airlines operating the McDonnell Douglas DC-10.

References

DC-10
Operators